Melody of Death is a 1922 British silent crime film directed by Floyd Martin Thornton and starring Philip Anthony, Enid R. Reed and Dick Sutherd. It is an adaptation of the 1915 novel The Melody of Death by Edgar Wallace.

Cast
 Philip Anthony as Gilbert Standerton  
 Enid R. Reed as Enid Cathcart  
 Dick Sutherd as George Wallis  
 H. Agar Lyons as Sir John Standerton  
 Frank Petley 
 Hetta Bartlett as Mrs Cathcart
 Bob Vallis

References

Bibliography
 Goble, Alan. The Complete Index to Literary Sources in Film. Walter de Gruyter, 1999.
 Low, Rachael. The History of the British Film 1918-1929. George Allen & Unwin, 1971.

External links
 

1922 films
1922 crime films
British crime films
British silent feature films
1920s English-language films
Films directed by Floyd Martin Thornton
Films based on British novels
Films based on works by Edgar Wallace
Stoll Pictures films
British black-and-white films
1920s British films